Mar Gregorios College Punnapra is an educational institution in Punnapra, Alappuzha. The college is affiliated to University of Kerala and owned and managed by the Archdiocese of Changanacherry. The college offers B.A, B.Com and B.CA courses.

History
The college was established under the management of Archdiocese of Changanacherry. The classes were started on 21 July 2014.

References

Christian universities and colleges in India
Colleges affiliated to the University of Kerala
Universities and colleges in Alappuzha district
Educational institutions established in 2014
2014 establishments in Kerala